Kneeboard may refer to:

Kneeboard, a surfboard ridden in a kneeling stance
Pilot's kneeboard, a flight accessory for pilots to hold maps, etc.
 Kneeboard, or kickboard, part of a pedal keyboard